Overskate (1975–1992) was a Canadian Thoroughbred Champion Hall of Fame racehorse. Sired by Nodouble out of the dam Overstate who was a descendant of the great sire Princequillo as well as Man o' War, Overskate was foaled at his owner's farm in Port Elgin, Ontario.

A small but versatile horse, Overskate raced successfully on grass and dirt racecourses and won major races on rain-soaked sloppy tracks. During his career, he was voted an unprecedented nine Sovereign Awards while racing in Canada and at various tracks in the United States. The colt set track records for 9 furlongs (1 1/8 miles) at Assiniboia Downs in Winnipeg, Manitoba and for 11 furlongs (1 3/8 miles) on turf at Belmont Park in Elmont, New York.

Ridden by jockey Robin Platts, Overskate came off his 1977 two-year-old championship season with a win in the Plate Trial Stakes but then finished second in the 1978 Queen's Plate, Canada's most prestigious race and the first leg of the Canadian Triple Crown. However, the colt came back to win the next two Triple Crown races, the Prince of Wales and Breeders' Stakes. Successful at age four and five, the two-time Canadian Horse of the Year was retired in 1980 as the all-time leading money winner among Canadian-bred horses.

References
 Overskate's pedigree and racing stats
 Overskate at the Canadian Horse Racing Hall of Fame

1975 racehorse births
1992 racehorse deaths
Racehorses bred in Ontario
Racehorses trained in Canada
Horse racing track record setters
Sovereign Award winners
Canadian Thoroughbred Horse of the Year
Canadian Horse Racing Hall of Fame inductees
Thoroughbred family 22-b